Juan Joya Borja (5 April 1956 – 28 April 2021) was a Spanish comedian and actor known by the stage name El Risitas ("The Giggles" in Spanish). He gained widespread popularity in 2015 thanks to a series of memes based on a television interview recorded in 2001 on Jesús Quintero's TV show Ratones Coloraos.

Biography 
Joya was born in Seville, Andalusia on 5 April 1956. He had a number of jobs throughout his life, including cooking and unloading sacks of cement.

His first appearance on television was in 2001, on Jesús Quintero's show El Vagamundo, where he interviewed on various life situations with his partner "El Peíto" or "el Cuñao" Antonio Rivera (1959–2003 December), in a comedic tone. He became recognizable for his high-pitched, wheezing laugh (described in The Guardian as like a "dolphin with a 20-a-day habit"), which led to his nickname "El Risitas" ("Giggles" in English). He also appeared in the 2005 film Torrente 3: El protector. When he became known internationally around 2015 he also performed for companies outside of Spain, for example in a Finnish commercial.

Ratones Coloraos interview meme
In 2001, Joya appeared on Jesús Quintero's show Ratones Coloraos and described an incident when he worked as a kitchen porter. He describes leaving some paella pans (paelleras) at night in the ocean to soak and clean, and when in the morning he returned to retrieve the pans, they had washed out to sea with the tide. He frequently interrupts the story with his trademark laugh. The original video was uploaded to YouTube on 25 June 2007, and received over a million views eight years before the meme became widespread.

In March 2014, footage from the interview was used in Egypt by the then recently-outlawed Muslim Brotherhood organization to parody presidential candidate Abdel Fattah el-Sisi. Other videos featuring footage from the interview were also produced; however, they were usually apolitical instead, generally parodying technology and gaming. The most viewed versions of the video subtitled Joya as the designer of the Nvidia GeForce GTX 970 graphics card, a designer of Team Fortress 2, a Valve employee discussing Dota 2, a Canon representative discussing the C300 camera, an Xbox Live employee describing the platform's system, and a cinematographer describing shooting on a Red camera.

In March 2015, the meme received significant attention after the launch of the 2015 MacBook, where subtitles present Joya as a designer who worked on the prototype. Within a month the video had received over five million views on YouTube. The meme's impact has been compared to parodies of the 2004 war drama Downfall, where scenes from the film are similarly edited with fake subtitles.

In 2019, a zoomed-in still image of his face from the interview, named KEKW, was added as a 3rd-party emote for Twitch on FrankerFaceZ. As of April 2022, over 100,000 channels on Twitch have enabled the emote. With more than 400 million uses in chat, the emote occupies 10th place among the most popular FrankerFaceZ emotes.

Health and death
In September 2020, Joya was admitted to the Hospital de la Caridad in Seville, where he underwent an intervention for a vascular problem and had a leg amputated. 

Less than a year later, at noon on 28 April 2021, Joya was transferred from the Hospital de la Caridad to the Hospital Universitario Virgen del Rocío, after a sudden relapse. He died from complications of his illness later that afternoon at the age of 65.

Filmography 
 Torrente 3: El protector (2005)

Television 
 El Vagamundo (2000–2002) – Canal 2 Andalucía
 Ratones Coloraos (2002–2005) – Canal Sur Televisión
 El loco de la colina (2006–2007) – La1
 El Gatopardo (2007–2012) – Canal Sur

References

External links 
 
 

1956 births
2021 deaths
Spanish comedians
Spanish male television actors
21st-century Spanish male actors
Spanish amputees
Internet memes introduced in 2015
People from Seville
Male actors from Andalusia